Elections to the French National Assembly were held in Gabon and French Congo on 2 June 1946, with a second round on 30 June.

Electoral system
The two seats allocated to the constituency were elected on two separate electoral rolls; French citizens elected one MP from the first college, whilst non-citizens elected one MP in the second college.

Results

First college

Second college

References

Gabon
1946 06
1946 06
1946 in Gabon
1946 in Moyen-Congo
1946
1946
Gabon